Winter's Tale is a 1983 magic realism novel by Mark Helprin. It takes place in a mythic New York City, markedly different from reality, and in an industrial  Edwardian era near the turn of the 20th century. The novel was adapted into a 2014 feature film by Akiva Goldsman.

Characters

Peter Lake
Peter Lake is the central character of Winter's Tale. An immigrant couple who were denied admission at Ellis Island due to consumption are forced to return to the ship City of Justice which had brought them. They break the display case containing a model of their ocean-going vessel and set their son Peter adrift in New York Harbor inside it. He is found in the reeds and adopted by the Baymen of the Bayonne Marsh, who send him off to Manhattan when he comes of age. There he first becomes a mechanic and then is forced to become a burglar in a gang called the Short Tails. He soon makes a mortal enemy of their leader, Pearly Soames, and is constantly on the run from the gang. Early one winter morning, Peter is on the brink of being captured and killed by the gang when he is rescued by a mysterious white horse, who becomes his guardian.

While attempting to rob a house, Peter meets and falls in love with Beverly Penn. The daughter of millionaire Isaac Penn, owner and publisher of The Sun, one of New York's greatest newspapers, Beverly is eccentric, free-spirited, and enigmatic. This captivates Peter initially, but her deeper nature is revealed with her terminal consumption. Beverly never disappears from Peter's life, protecting him until the very end. His love for the dying Beverly causes him to become obsessed with justice.

In yet another escape from Pearly's men, both Peter and the white horse crash into a mysterious recurring cloud wall, disappearing in it for decades. When Peter emerges, he no longer remembers who he is and is visibly no longer of this world, seeing and hearing things that nobody else can see or hear. One night, in a dream or a vision, he is carried on a tour of all the graves of the world, observing and remembering all the dead. In the apocalyptic chaos of burning New York, he acquires astonishing powers.

Peter refers to himself, earlier in his life, as "Grand Central Pete". In reality, there was a well-known confidence man in the late 19th century known by this name.

Athansor
Athansor, the white horse, acts as a guardian angel of Peter Lake. Able to fly and possessing extraordinary endurance, the white horse appears to be an angelic being. Before the end, Peter Lake releases him to finally let him go to heaven, as Athansor had not been able to do before because of Peter Lake.

The white horse appears on the first pages of the book, saving Peter Lake who is being pursued by the Short Tails. The name of the horse is unknown to Peter Lake, but when Peter Lake visits Bayonne Marsh, the Baymen recognise the horse as Athansor, part of their oral lore. The Baymen arrive from everywhere to view the horse, but never explain what they know about him besides the name and the fact that he comes from the left.

Athansor is separated from Peter Lake when they both crash into the cloud wall but gets reunited with him towards the end of the story. Peter Lake releases him, and Athansor heads towards the heavenly pastures. As he gallops across Manhattan, trying to lift off, the whole island shakes under his hoofbeats.

Beverly Penn
Beverly Penn is a young woman dying from consumption who meets Peter Lake when he breaks into her house. Beverly is a visionary who can feel the universe. She writes down equations that explain the universe and mean for her that the universe shouts and growls. Beverly's father, newspaper publisher Isaac Penn, says about her that she had seen the Golden Age.

Even after her death, Beverly protects Peter Lake. Pearly Soames says that he tried but could not get to Peter Lake through Beverly's protection.

Jackson Mead
A master bridge builder and an enigmatic figure, Jackson Mead constructed many fine bridges all around the country. He is a brilliant engineer and appears to have unlimited material resources for the job. He is eventually revealed to be an exile from heaven, whose purpose is to build one last bridge that will bring forth the end of the world as it is, letting him return to heaven. As Jackson Mead puts it, his purpose is "to tag this world with wider and wider rainbows, until the last is so perfect and eternal that it will catch the eye of the One who has abandoned us, and bring Him to right all the broken symmetries and make life once again a still and timeless dream. My purpose, Mr. Marratta, is to stop time, to bring back the dead. My purpose, in one word, is justice." Jackson Mead's rainbow bridge does not take, but he is not upset by the failure and disappears to bide time until his next attempt.

It is interesting that Jackson Mead's stated goal "to stop time and bring back the dead", in precisely these words, is widely associated with Peter Lake and in particular attributed to him on the back of the paperback edition.

Jackson Mead's character is partially based on Joseph Strauss, the engineer of the Golden Gate Bridge. Hardesty Marratta recognizes Jackson Mead's face in the face of the monument to Joseph Strauss at the Golden Gate. The inscription on the monument refers to the bridge as the "eternal rainbow", a simile used by Jackson Mead.

However, despite being a main character in the novel, he does not make an appearance in the movie.

Residents of Lake of the Coheeries
Lake of the Coheeries is a semi-mythical lake and village, playing the role of Faerie, Elfland, or Alfheim.  Lake of the Coheeries is fictional, supposedly located in upstate New York across a mountain range from the Hudson River Valley.  Virginia Gamely is a resident there, living with her mother, Mrs. Gamely.  Both women ultimately play roles in New York City at the end of the tale.  Virginia's daughter is resurrected by Peter Lake.

Literary significance and reception
Winter's Tale was published in 1983.  It was praised on the front cover of the New York Times Book Review (NYTBR) as "funny, thoughtful, passionate...large-souled." 
Reviewing the novel in Interzone magazine, Mary Gentle described Winter's Tale as
"a faerie family saga" and "the first specifically capitalist fantasy".
David Pringle, in the book Modern Fantasy: The 100 Best Novels, praised Winter's Tale as "a haunting piece of North American
magic realism". According to Benjamin Nugent in n+1, the book describes how a conservative feels, saying "It’s one thing to understand Reaganism by reading an op-ed about the restoration of patriotism. It’s another to understand Reaganism as a desire for a miraculous resurrection, mixed with adulation for the heroic dying Indian, and to apprehend some sense of how that desire and that adulation feel." In May 2006, the New York Times Book Review published a list of American novels, compiled from the responses to "a short letter [from the review] to a couple of hundred prominent writers, critics, editors and other literary sages, asking them to identify 'the single best work of American fiction published in the last 25 years.'" Among the 22 books to have received multiple votes was Helprin's Winter's Tale.

Film adaptation
The film adaptation was released on Valentine's Day, 2014 and starred Colin Farrell as Peter Lake, Russell Crowe as Pearly Soames, Jessica Brown Findlay as Beverly Penn, Jennifer Connelly as Virginia Gamely, and Will Smith as Lucifer though originally credited as "Judge".

The movie began filming in New York in October 2012  with a slight delay due to Hurricane Sandy. Shooting on the film ran through early 2013 and operated on a $60 million budget, down from the original $75 million budget. It is unknown when Helprin sold the movie rights, with one report of Martin Scorsese originally purchasing the rights.

Akiva Goldsman wrote the screenplay adaptation for the movie and is also making this his directing debut. Warner Bros. Pictures approved the picture in February 2011. The cinematographer is Caleb Deschanel; composer Hans Zimmer wrote the score.

Characters not appearing in the film include Jackson Mead, Virginia's son Martin, and both Vittorio and Hardesty Marratta.

References

External links
 

1983 American novels
1983 fantasy novels
American alternate history novels
Novels by Mark Helprin
American magic realism novels
Novels set in New York City
American fantasy novels adapted into films
Weidenfeld & Nicolson books